Anthony Clark Arend (born October 24, 1958) is Professor of Government and Foreign Service at Georgetown University. On June 1, 2020, he became Chair of the Department of Government. From August 1, 2015 until July 15, 2018, he served as Senior Associate Dean (later Vice Dean) for Graduate and Faculty Affairs in the Walsh School of Foreign Service at Georgetown University. He served as Director of the Master of Science in Foreign Service Program at the Walsh School from 2008–2017. With Christopher C. Joyner, he founded the Institute for International Law and Politics (now called the Institute for Law, Science and Global Security) at Georgetown University and served as co-director of the Institute from 2003–2008. He has also served as an adjunct professor of law at the Georgetown University Law Center. From 2005–2009, he edited the blog, Exploring International Law. His blog can now be found at the website AnthonyClarkArend.com He is a member of the Council on Foreign Relations and is Chair of the Faculty Editorial Board of Georgetown University Press. In April 2017, Arend received the John Carroll Award from the Georgetown University Alumni Association. This award "is conferred upon Georgetown alumni whose achievements and record of service exemplify the ideals and traditions of Georgetown and its founder" and is the highest honor given by the Alumni Association.

Education
Dr. Arend received a Ph.D. (1985) and an M.A. (1982) in Foreign Affairs from the Department of Government and Foreign Affairs of the University of Virginia. He received a B.S.F.S. (1980), magna cum laude, from the Edmund A. Walsh School of Foreign Service at Georgetown University.

Academic Career and Scholarly Expertise
Dr. Arend has served virtually his entire professorial career at Georgetown University, his undergraduate alma mater.  Prior to joining Georgetown's faculty, he was a Senior Fellow at the Center for National Security Law at the University of Virginia School of Law. Arend specializes in international law, international organizations, international relations, international legal philosophy, and constitutional law of United States foreign relations. In his theoretical work, he has applied constructivist international relation theory to international law. In 2014, Arend and Ambassador Mark P. Lagon, former director of the US Office to Monitor and Combat Trafficking in Persons, published "Human Dignity and the Future of Global Institutions". The book seeks to advance an international dialogue about the promotion of human dignity.

Bibliography
Arend is the author, co-author, or co-editor of several books, including:

 Legal Rules and International Society
 Human Dignity and the Future of Global Institutions (with Mark P. Lagon)
 International Rules (with Robert J. Beck and Robert Vander Lugt)
 International Law and the Use of Force: Beyond the United Nations Charter Paradigm (with Robert J. Beck)
 Pursuing a Just and Durable Peace: John Foster Dulles and International Organization
 The Falklands War: Lessons for Strategy, Diplomacy, and International Law (with Alberto R. Coll)

References

External links
Arend Biography Georgetown
Article in The Blue & Gray
Lauren Burgoon, "Arend Welcomes MSFS Grads to the 'World of Service'"
Video: Arend Interviewed by School of Foreign Service Interim Dean Carol Lancaster about the Obama Administration and the UN
Video: Obama’s Diplomatic Initiatives January 1, 2010, C-SPAN Interview with Anthony Clark Arend on Washington Journal
 
 

1958 births
American male bloggers
American bloggers
Deans of the Walsh School of Foreign Service
American legal scholars
American international relations scholars
Georgetown University Law Center faculty
International law scholars
Living people